Kuldeep Singh (also spelled Kuldip Singh) is a music director for Hindi theatre and Hindi films, most known for composing ghazals such as Tumko Dekha To Ye Khayal Aaya Saath Saath (1982) and Itni Shakti Hame Dena Daata (Ankush).

He has been actively involved in giving music for theatre and is involved with IPTA. He has composed for popular acts like Aakhiri Shama, Kaifi Aur Main, Girija Ke Sapne which are regularly featured in Mumbai and other parts of the country.

Early life
Kuldeep Singh is father of young Ghazal maestro Jasvinder Singh.

Discography

Music director
 Saath Saath (1982).
 Ankush (1986)

Awards
 He received the Sangeet Natak Akademi Award in 2009 for Music for Theatre in Allied Theatre Arts category.
In 2020, the government of Madhya Pradesh awarded him Lata Mangeshkar Award in recognition of his contribution to music.

References

External links

Year of birth missing (living people)
Living people
Indian Sikhs
Punjabi people
Recipients of the Sangeet Natak Akademi Award
Indian composers
Indian musical theatre composers
Hindi film score composers
Hindi theatre